"This Be The Verse" is a lyric poem in three stanzas with an alternating rhyme scheme, by the English poet Philip Larkin (1922–1985). It was written around April 1971, was first published in the August 1971 issue of New Humanist, and appeared in the 1974 collection High Windows.

It is one of Larkin's best-known poems; the opening lines  ("They fuck you up, your mum and dad") are among his most frequently quoted. Larkin himself compared it with W. B. Yeats's "Lake Isle of Innisfree" and said he expected to hear it recited in his honour by a thousand Girl Guides before he died. It is frequently parodied. Television viewers in the United Kingdom voted it one of the "Nation's Top 100 Poems".

Synopsis
The poem consists of three stanzas of four iambic tetrameter feet on an alternating rhyme scheme. The speaker, addressing the reader directly, expresses the idea that parents put a lot of emotional weight on their children with the famous line, "They fuck you up, your mum and dad". The speaker goes on to explain that it may not be intentional, but stems from their own emotional baggage (with "some extra, just for you"). In the second stanza, the speaker describes the way that the reader's parents were also given this emotional trauma by their parents. The third stanza is where the poem makes its assertion: the misery humanity experiences is a cycle that expands continuously. The speaker concludes with some advice: "Get out as early as you can... And don’t have any kids yourself".

The title of the poem is an allusion to Robert Louis Stevenson's "Requiem" ("This be the verse you grave for me"). Stevenson's thought of a happy homecoming in death is given an ironic turn. He often thought of dying in a ditch, but ended up dying peacefully in his home at the age of 44. Being a "[g]othic writer", Stevenson wrote a lot of grim stories. His most famous is The Strange Case of Dr. Jekyll and Mr. Hyde.

Enduring appeal
A testament to the enduring appeal of Larkin's poem came in April 2009, when the first four lines were recited by a British appeal court judge as part of his judgement of a particularly acrimonious divorce case involving the future custody arrangements of a nine-year-old child. Lord Justice Wall referred to the emotional damage caused to the child, saying: "These four lines seem to me to give a clear warning to parents who, post-separation, continue to fight the battles of the past, and show each other no respect."

References in popular culture

In a 2002 interview on Parkinson, David Bowie quoted the first and last stanzas, when asked about his relationship with his parents.
The final stanza of the poem, in its entirety, becomes the last words of villain Count Olaf in The End, the final book of A Series of Unfortunate Events by Lemony Snicket.
Anne Clark performed a version to music on her 1988 album R.S.V.P., calling it "a nursery rhyme for grown-ups". The song was first published on her 1987 album Hopeless Cases.
The title of the 1991 Issue 37 of Granta, "The Family: They Fuck You Up", was taken from the poem, which is also referenced in the editor's introduction.
The opening of the poem is referenced in the fourth episode of the third series of the E4 drama Skins.
The opening line is quoted by the Monkey Dust character known only as Chat room pervert, who wrote "they fuck you up, your mum and dad... as eminem says".
British clinical psychologist Oliver James published a book in 2002 titled They F*** You Up, starting each chapter with a line or stanza from Larkin's verse, followed in 2010 by a further book on parenting and child development called How Not to F*** Them Up.
The Talking Heads song "Sax and Violins" features a variation of the poem's opening line: "Mom and Pop, they will fuck you up, for sure."
The Philadelphian punk band Ex Friends put the words of the poem to music in their digital single "This Be The Verse".
The first stanza is quoted in the second episode of the ninth season of American television show Criminal Minds, but with the euphemism "They mess you up, your mum and dad."
Grant Morrison's DC Comics limited series The Multiversity name-drops the poem in the third issue, Earth Me, in which Alexis Luthor, daughter of Lex Luthor, refers to it as "the best poem ever".
In The Wicked + The Divine, the first stanza of the poem is associated with the comic's character, Lucifer.
A former contemporary quotes the opening stanzas to Nancy in Dearborn-Again, episode 10, season 6 of Weeds, a U.S. TV show.
Allison Williams' character could be seen quoting the first two lines of the poem to Benedict Cumberbatch's character in the trailer for Patrick Melrose.
Streetwear brand Supreme used the first stanza of the poem on both a hoodie and t-shirt as part of its FW16 collection.
The first and last stanzas are credited to poet Ruth Zardo in Kingdom of the Blind by Louise Penny.
The first line of the poem is quoted in Little Fires Everywhere by Celeste Ng.
In the HBO TV series Succession, season 1: episode 7, titled Austerlitz, the Roy family attend a therapy session with Alon (Griffin Dunne), who opens the session with the first stanza of the poem.
In the Apple TV+ series [Shantaram], season 1: episode 5, titled https://www.imdb.com/title/tt10995070/?ref_=tt_eps_rec The Sin in the Crime], Charlie Hunnam's character, Lin, is seen quoting the first line of the poem to Antonia Desplat's character, Karla, who continues quoting the second line of the poem.
The first stanza is quoted in Firefly Lane, Season 2: Episode 6, "Reborn on the Fourth of July". A valet quotes the first few lines of the poem to Katherine Heigl's character, Tully, as they sit on the hood of her car.

See also
List of poems by Philip Larkin

References

External links
Philip Larkin reads "This Be the Verse" - YouTube Audio File.
The Poet of Dirty Words: History takes a second look at Philip Larkin by Stephen Burt at slate.com.
Full text of the poem Philip Larkin, "This Be the Verse" from Collected Poems. Copyright © Estate of Philip Larkin.

Poetry by Philip Larkin
Works originally published in New Humanist
1971 poems